The Australian bushfire season over the summer of 2007–2008, experienced fire occurrence below average for the season as some regions experienced increased rainfall and reduced fuel as a result of extensive fires during the previous 2006–07 season, particularly in Victoria where the fires in the 2006–07 season burnt over 1.1 million hectares of land. Fires in Victoria during the 2007–08 season burnt less than a fifth of the land area usually burnt during an average bushfire season.

An analysis of bushfires in Victoria on public land by the Department of Sustainability and Environment revealed that the 2007–08 fires burnt 32,368 hectares, or 18.7% of the long-term average of 173,152 hectares. It was also estimated that 26% of these fires were caused by lightning strikes and 25% by arson.

Predictions
In the 3 months leading up to the summer 2007–08, many states and regions experienced far below average rainfalls and when several fires spread through October 2007, which led to predictions of an above average bushfire season, late rainfalls quelled bushfire occurrence later in the season.

Fires of note

References

Australian bushfire season
Australian bushfire season
2007
Bushfire
Bushfire
Bush 
Bush